This is a list of flag bearers who have represented Bolivia at the Olympics.

Flag bearers carry the national flag of their country at the opening ceremony of the Olympic Games.

See also
Bolivia at the Olympics

References

Bolivia at the Olympics
Bolivia
Olympic